Zach Cherry is an American actor and improv comedian. He is known for his role as Dylan George on the Apple TV+ series Severance.

Life and career
Zach Cherry was born in 1987. He attended Princeton Day School and Amherst College. He began taking improv lessons in 2011, and was placed on a house team at the Upright Citizens Brigade Theatre in New York in 2017.

In 2018, Cherry played a lead role in season one of Netflix's series You, as bookstore clerk Ethan Russell.

In 2022, Cherry had a lead role in the 2022 Apple TV+ series Severance. He played Wolf on FOX's Duncanville, Pete's manager Kevin on Crashing (2017–2019), and Norman on I Feel Bad (2018). He has also had minor roles on Succession and Living with Yourself. He also played a character in two Marvel Studios movies: Shang-Chi and the Legend of the Ten Rings and Spider-Man: Homecoming.

In August 2022, it was announced that Cherry and actress  Ellie Kemper would host the sixth season of The Great American Baking Show, an American adaptation of the baking reality TV show The Great British Bake Off. The season will air on streaming television service The Roku Channel.

Selected filmography

Film

Television

References

External links 

 

Upright Citizens Brigade Theater performers
21st-century American male actors
American male television actors
Living people
1987 births